Eleutherodactylus ricordii is a species of frog in the family Eleutherodactylidae endemic to Cuba. Its natural habitats are subtropical or tropical moist lowland forest, subtropical or tropical moist montane forest, and rocky areas. It is threatened by habitat loss.

References

ricordii
Endemic fauna of Cuba
Amphibians of Cuba
Amphibians described in 1841
Taxa named by André Marie Constant Duméril
Taxa named by Gabriel Bibron
Taxonomy articles created by Polbot